The Middle States Commission on Higher Education (abbreviated as MSCHE and legally incorporated as the Mid-Atlantic Region Commission on Higher Education) is a voluntary, peer-based, non-profit membership organization that performs peer evaluation and accreditation of public and private universities and colleges in the United States and foreign higher education institutions. Until federal regulations changed on July 1, 2020, it was considered one of the seven regional accreditation organizations dating back 130 years. MSCHE, which is now an institutional accreditor, is recognized by the United States Department of Education and the Council for Higher Education Accreditation.

Its headquarters are in University City, Philadelphia. It accredits nearly 600 institutions, primarily in Delaware, Washington, D.C., Maryland, New Jersey, New York, Pennsylvania, Puerto Rico, and the U.S. Virgin Islands.

Region and scope
The Middle States Commission on Higher Education is recognized by the United States Department of Education to accredit degree-granting institutions. Its traditional region was in the states of New York, New Jersey, Pennsylvania, Delaware, and Maryland; the District of Columbia (Washington, D.C.), plus the American territories/commonwealths of Puerto Rico, and the U.S. Virgin Islands (in the Caribbean Sea), that wish to participate in Federal "Title IV" student loan programs. The Commission conducts business in 48 states, the exceptions being North Dakota and Montana; two U.S. Territories (Puerto Rico and the U.S. Virgin Islands); and the District of Columbia. Its footprint extends to 94 countries.

History
MSCHE grew out of the Middle States Association of Colleges and Schools (MSA), an organization established in 1887 to improve education using evaluation and accreditation. MSCHE itself was established in 1919 and was one of three commissions of MSA until 2013 when MSCHE incorporated as a separate entity in Pennsylvania as the Mid-Atlantic Region Commission on Higher Education doing business as the Middle States Commission on Higher Education. On July 1, 2019, MSCHE withdrew from MSA completely.

See also
Higher education accreditation
List of recognized higher education accreditation organizations
Educational accreditation
United States Department of Education

References

External links
 Official website

School accreditors
College and university associations and consortia in the United States
Educational organizations based in the United States